is a female professional 5 dan Go player. She is currently an affiliate of the Nihon Ki-in, the largest Go association of Japan, and was a student of Yasumasa Hane.

On 4 September 2008, Aoba was defeated by Crazy Stone, a Monte-Carlo Tree Search Go playing engine, in an 8-stone handicap game in Tokyo, Japan. The exhibition match marks the earliest official defeat of a professional by a computer with a conventional handicap.

Notes

Japanese Go players
Female Go players
1978 births
Living people